Harvey Bullock is a fictional detective appearing in American comic books published by DC Comics, commonly in association with the superhero Batman. The character first appeared in Detective Comics #441 (June 1974) and was created by Archie Goodwin and Howard Chaykin. In animation, he appeared throughout the DC Animated Universe voiced by Robert Costanzo. He debuted in live-action in 2014 on Fox's television series Gotham, portrayed by Donal Logue.

Publication history
There is some ambiguity concerning the character's origins. Writer Doug Moench and artist Don Newton introduced Harvey Bullock in Batman #361 (July 1983) as a device to resolve the ongoing plotline with Gotham City's corrupt mayor Hamilton Hill, and subsequent Who's Who in the DC Universe entries acknowledged this as the new Bullock's first appearance. However, in later years Batman fans began pointing out that a "Lt. Bullock" appeared in three panels of Detective Comics #441 (1974), written by Archie Goodwin, pencilled by Howard Chaykin, and published almost a decade before. Moench admitted that he must have read this comic because he is an Archie Goodwin fan, but denied that Harvey Bullock is the same character. He argued that it is unlikely that he drew on Goodwin's Lt. Bullock even unconsciously, since there are discrepancies of both personality and continuity between his character and Goodwin's, and he distinctly remembers taking the name "Bullock" from guitarist Hiram Bullock. Archie Goodwin is legally Harvey Bullock's sole creator; Moench said he decided not to contest this because he did not want to make a case against Goodwin's widow Anne Goodwin, whom he considers a friend.

Following the conclusion of the Hamilton Hill storyline, Moench decided he enjoyed writing Harvey Bullock enough to keep him on as a supporting character, which necessitated some softening of his original characterization as a corrupt cop. Bullock was one of several Batman supporting cast members swept out of the Batman family of titles when Denny O'Neil became the Batman editor in 1986, but in 1987 writer Paul Kupperberg brought him into the Vigilante cast. Kupperberg recalled, "Harvey Bullock was a character very much in my wheelhouse, a wise-cracking loudmouth with a Brooklyn accent and a problem with authority, although he wasn't originally intended to be a permanent member of the Vigilante cast. He was brought in for a guest-shot, as a character to help Vigilante's handler, Harry Stein, grease the wheels in Gotham City for them on whatever case they were on. I had fun writing him, and the interaction between Harvey and Harry Stein, another slob with his own way of doing things, clicked. I don't think they were using him much, if at all, in the Batman books by then, so we got permission from the Bat-office to have the character on semi-permanent loan for Vigilante and its successor title, Checkmate."

Fictional character biography
Prior to the 1985–1986 DC maxi-series Crisis on Infinite Earths, Bullock was a crooked police detective under instructions from Gotham City's Mayor Hamilton Hill to sabotage Commissioner Gordon's career when he is formally re-introduced in Batman #361 (July 1983), in the story entitled "The Most Successful Species", written by Doug Moench and penciled by Don Newton. His method of doing so was to pretend to be exceedingly clumsy, thereby spoiling whatever Gordon was trying to do, seemingly accidentally. After inadvertently giving Gordon a heart attack, however, Bullock turns over a new leaf. His character later develops into a well-meaning cop who (probably) was exceedingly clumsy, similar to the later animated version. He also forms a close bond with Robin, based initially on their mutual love of old movies. Subsequent to this, he is a Bishop in the spy organization Checkmate.

Post-Crisis
Following the continuity changes brought about in most of DC's comics by Crisis, Bullock is perhaps the most controversial police officer in the Gotham City Police Department. His colleagues in the Major Crimes Unit swear up and down that he is a good cop, despite his reputation for taking bribes, using excessive force, and having ties to organized crime. He is not without endearing qualities, however, including a fondness for doughnuts and a hidden sentimental streak. He also has a brief relationship with a widow he meets at work.

This new post-Crisis Bullock was retconned as having been loyal to Gordon from the start. Even before he is promoted to detective, he stays by Gordon during one of the Joker's rampages, saving his life. Eventually, without Batman's assistance, Bullock and Gordon stop the Joker from causing an explosion that would have leveled Gotham City. During the entire case, Bullock plays the part of the "bad cop," intimidating and threatening whoever gets in his way. At this point, Bullock still wears a regular police uniform.

Made detective
Several years later, Bullock is made detective. He again works closely with Gordon, as part of a small crew of people Gordon knows he can trust. This group includes Maggie Sawyer, Harvey Dent, and Detective Cohen as they try to bring down Sal Maroni. Though Gordon knows of and has recordings of Bullock's brutality against suspects, he brings him in because the man has never accepted bribes. The events surrounding this squad work around the events of Batman: The Long Halloween. Bullock and the group are then joined by Crispus Allen, and together they take down a gathering of Gotham's "freaks", such as the Joker, Clayface and Scarecrow. Later Bullock is partnered with Renee Montoya and they both become very loyal to each other. For a time Bullock works with the international spy agency Checkmate. They confront threats ranging from counterfeiters to cult-terrorists. He has a rocky relationship with those above him, such as defying intelligence expert Amanda Waller over the proposed murder of heroic vigilante Black Thorn.

Bullock also gained his own story arc, "A Bullet for Bullock" by Chuck Dixon. The story is about someone trying to kill him, which was also adapted into an episode for Batman: The Animated Series.

Bullock is on the front lines during the "Knightfall" storyline when Arkham empties and its inmates riot through the streets. Bullock takes control when Riddler takes an entire talk show hostage. He is almost obliterated by a bomb planted in the mayor's mansion; he is saved at the last second by Batman.

During the "Trioka" arc, Bullock is badly injured during a confrontation with the KGBeast, who has gained control of a small nuclear weapon. Robin and several members of the Gotham City Police Department brave a burning chemical plant, partly to save his life. Bullock almost dies during this incident, but is saved by CPR administered by Robin. Mackenzie "Hardback" Bock, a newcomer to the force, becomes involved, helping Robin carry Harvey out of harm's way. The nuclear bomb is then neutralized by Batman.

Earthquake
In the Batman: Cataclysm storyline, Bullock is confronting Anarky in a shopping mall when an earthquake hits Gotham City. Both save their own lives by diving into a hollow art structure. Despite this, Bullock's arm is impaled by a tube of metal. He does not let this stop him, and makes his way back to the badly damaged police headquarters.

As soon as he learns Gordon is missing, he slams his arm against a wall, knocking out the bar, and institutes a search. Bullock finds and saves a rattled Gordon from the debris of his own office.

A few weeks later, Gotham is shut down and closed off by the government in the incident known as No Man's Land. Bullock and several other officers, Renee included, willingly stay behind to assist Gordon. Bullock sticks by Gordon through the death of many fellow officers. When SWAT leader Billy Pettit revolts and takes even more officers with him, Bullock sticks with Gordon. Renee herself is even lost for a while due to Two-Face. In the end, efforts led by Lex Luthor re-open Gotham. Gordon, Bullock, Renee and the remaining officers (Pettit and the others had been killed) are given their jobs back. Bullock is then promoted to lieutenant and becomes the shift commander of the GCPD's Major Crimes Unit.

In the "Officer Down" storyline, disgruntled former officer Jordan Rich attempts to kill Gordon. Afterwards, a vengeful Bullock reveals Rich's location to the Mafia, thereby indirectly killing the shooter. When evidence of this comes out, he resigns from the force.

He then appears in the "Unresolved" story arc in Gotham Central, where he has descended into a life of alcoholism and is shown contemplating suicide.

Back on the force
As part of DC's "One Year Later" storyline, Bullock has returned to the GCPD, with the understanding that he is not allowed a single mistake. The circumstances behind this are unknown, the only clue so far being the line: "Six months since Harvey Bullock made his discoveries." Batman and Bullock have made their peace, agreeing to give each other a second chance after their past disagreements; Batman tells Bullock that he considers the ledger "erased".

Bullock is seen as one of the leads against the fight of a war between unauthorized Joker and Batman gangs.

Later it is established he keeps in regular communication with his mother and has two cats, one of which, Sprinkles, has cancer.

While little has ever been told of Harvey's past prior to him joining the Gotham City Police Department, he himself has stated that he was once a welterweight Golden Gloves competitor and was good enough to go pro, but chose not to because he disliked the "regimented lifestyle".

The New 52
Bullock is sent to meet and greet Jason Bard, whom Gordon has recruited for the police force. Bullock is shown to be on friendly terms with fellow Gotham cop Maggie Sawyer. Hours later, Bard arrests James Gordon for manslaughter after a train crash.

During the investigation into a long-running series of police murders, Bullock is kidnapped and replaced by a female killer known as Jane Doe. Jane is obsessed with the figurative and literal taking of other people's lives. That it was only Batman who noticed Bullock had been replaced causes the detective great distress.

Harvey assists in citywide riots by helping James Gordon, now exonerated thanks to Batgirl, wire the entire city to display the Bat-signal. This raises the morale of the citizens and calms much of the panic.

DC Rebirth
In the DC Rebirth reboot universe, Bullock is partnered with Commissioner Gordon when he attempts to raid Wayne Manor. Bullock tries to convince Gordon not to go through with it, but is unable to. Bullock goes on to cameo several times, usually alongside Gordon  In the alternate future where Tim Drake becomes the Batman, Bullock is seen as an aid to Commissioner Montoya in the old section of the city. In the aftermath of the city of Bane. Harvey Bullock is filling as commissioner of Gotham City Police department after Jim Gordon who disappeared after being infected by a virus from the Batman Who Laughs.

Other versions

Batman Adventures
In the comic book The Batman Adventures, Bullock is forced to resign after Oswald Cobblepot becomes mayor, thanks to Temple Fugate rigging the elections to exact revenge on Mayor Hill. As with the DCU version, he becomes a private detective.

Earth One
The Batman: Earth One graphic novel features a very different version of the Bullock character. This Bullock is young, fit, and handsome, the former star of a reality show called Hollywood Detectives. He comes to Gotham to solve the old Wayne Murder case. Despite his flashy exterior, he is a well-trained and highly qualified police officer with good morals. However, he is not averse of police brutality if situations force him into it to get a job done. He is partnered with James Gordon, who he at first believes is taking bribes. He later finds out that the real reason Gordon doesn't stop crimes is because he fears that the mob will kill his daughter like they allegedly killed his wife. When Barbara Gordon is kidnapped by a murderer known as the Birthday Boy, the two go to rescue her, and they manage to do it with Batman's help. However, finding the bodies of Birthday Boy's previous victims breaks Bullock and he becomes an alcoholic. As of Volume Two, Bullock begin to recover his alcoholism after being urged from Gordon that he needs Bullock as an ally.

Earth-Three
In Earth-Three, a universe where all heroes are villains, Harvey's counterpart appears in Justice League #24 in Outsider's flashback. Harvey Bullock of Earth-Three is still a member of Gotham Police, but he is a corrupt cop. Like the rest of GCPD of this universe, he works under Owlman. He is seen with the Earth-Three version of Renee Montoya in an alleyway pulling their guns out and stopping a family who was out watching a movie nearby. They demand the family to empty out their purses and wallets "in the name of the law". The family however are also armed with guns and begin firing. Harvey then requests backup but it is denied as the rest of the police are currently helping Owlman track down the Joker (who is a hero in this universe). Renee and Bullock are then run over by Outsider despite them being allies since the Outsider was trying his best to follow Owlman. It is unclear whether Outsider did not see them or he simply did not care since Gotham PD worked under Owlman and he believed them to be expendable.

In the "Infinite Frontier" reboot, Harvey Bullock was the one who killed Thomas, Martha and Bruce Wayne while Thomas Wayne Jr. survives and eventually becomes Owlman. In 2012 Owlman captured Bullock, intending to hand him over to the police to serve a life sentence in prison. Bullock recognizes Owlman as Thomas Wayne Jr. and tries to bargain for his life by revealing that his parents were criminals who worked for Boss Gordon and tried to usurp his empire, killing his son in the process. Bullock was ordered to kill the Waynes in retribution. After learning the truth, Owlman became nihilistic and renounced his code, dropping Bullock from the top of Wayne Tower to his death.

Flashpoint
In the Flashpoint universe, Harvey Bullock is an alcoholic who patronizes Montoya's bar. Batman interrogates him for information on the Joker.

Injustice: Gods Among Us
In the alternate reality of Injustice: Gods Among Us Superman has subtly taken over the planet and violently taken over Gotham City. Harvey Bullock is brutally beaten by a 'stormtrooper' (a super-soldier working for the Regime) for trying to show his badge. In response to Superman's various crimes, Harvey and many of Gotham's police take stolen Krytptonian technology and gain super-powers, putting them on Superman's level and thus starting a war to take back their city. In "Year Three," Bullock quits the Insurgency when they become affiliated with Doctor Fate and John Constantine, claiming that this is now out of his league. Detective Chimp though tells him that he's a good cop and that they need him to help take down Superman, but before Harvey makes his decision, The Spectre bursts through the door and kills Harvey by obliterating him and his skeletal remains.

JLA: The Nail
In the Elseworlds series JLA: The Nail, Bullock is shown to be Gotham's Commissioner of Police. (Reference is made to Gordon having been murdered, but nothing specific is known about his death.) Bullock is even shown defending Batman against reporters in one panel, an opposite of mainstream Bullock.

Whom Gods Destroy
In this universe, Bullock and Montoya are two Secret Service agents assigned to Presidential detail.

Batman '89
Bullock is set to appear alongside Commissioner Gordon in the Batman '89 comic book series, a canonical comic continuation of Tim Burton's Batman films, with screenwriter Sam Hamm returning to write the script with Joe Quinones providing the comic's art. Bullock was initially included in Hamm's original script for Batman Returns, but the character was eventually discarded.

In other media

Television

Live-action

 Harvey Bullock made his first live-action appearance in the Fox series Gotham, portrayed by actor Donal Logue. This version is Detective Jim Gordon's (Ben McKenzie) partner, who introduces him to Gotham's seedy underbelly. He is portrayed as willing to bend - and sometimes break - the law to get results. He has ties to organized crime bosses Carmine Falcone (John Doman) and Fish Mooney (Jada Pinkett-Smith), with whom he trades police favors in exchange for information. It is revealed that GCPD's corrupt commissioner, Gillian B. Loeb (Peter Scolari), is blackmailing him; years earlier, Bullock's sergeant had coerced him into killing a mobster as a favor for the Falcone Crime Family, and Loeb uses that information to bend Bullock to his will. Gordon eventually blackmails Loeb into giving him Bullock's file. In Season 2, Bullock quits the police force after Loeb demotes him, stops drinking, and becomes a bartender. In the following episode, however, he returns to the force after a gang of insane criminals calling themselves "The Maniax" surfaces in Gotham. When Gordon is framed for murder by Edward Nygma, Bullock helps him escape from Blackgate Penitentiary with Carmine Falcone's help and clear his name. At the end of the second season, he is appointed as acting captain of the GCPD. In the third season, GCPD Captain Nathaniel Barnes (Michael Chiklis) is put in Arkham after he is exposed to Jervis Tetch's (Benedict Samuel) sister's blood and it turns him into a murderous vigilante; Bullock is made acting captain again in his absence. In the fourth season, Gordon discovers that Bullock is on Oswald Cobblepot's (Robin Lord Taylor) payroll due to the debts he is in and relieves him of his duties after Gordon becomes the new Captain. In the fifth season, Bullock remains in Gotham despite the U.S. government declaring the city a No Man's Land after the city's bridges and power plant is destroyed. Bullock aids Gordon and the GCPD by reclaiming the city from super villains and gangs. After the city rejoins the United States, he attends Gordon's promotion ceremony to GCPD Commissioner.

Animated

DC Animated Universe
Detective Harvey Bullock appears in series set in the DC Animated Universe, voiced by Robert Costanzo.
 Detective Bullock appears in Batman: The Animated Series. This version of the character retains his comics counterpart's rough, oafish manner, albeit without the drinking and smoking (he chews toothpicks instead, and in accordance with the cop cliché, he has a penchant for doughnuts and coffee). Although he dislikes and distrusts Batman, Bullock develops a grudging respect for the Dark Knight when Batman saves him from The Joker in "The Laughing Fish". Bullock, along with Commissioner Gordon, Mayor Hill, and Carl Rossum, is saved again by Batman in the two-part episode "Heart of Steel" when he and the others are abducted for the evil HARDAC computer's master plan to create robotic duplicates out of Gotham's officials. The android Bullock has a notable fight scene against Batman in said episode, although Batman defeats the duplicate by pushing him off a building and onto the Bat-Signal with Barbara Gordon's help; this distresses them both for moments when they think that they have killed Bullock. By the episode "The Man Who Killed Batman", Bullock is visibly saddened by the news of the vigilante's apparent death at the hands of Sidney "Sid the Squid" Debris. He has also used the Bat-Signal in Gordon's absence on two occasions, in the episodes "Lock-Up" and "A Bullet for Bullock". Bullock earns the wrath of Killer Croc after sending him to prison for killing a trade union member. Croc swears revenge on Bullock, and attempts to frame him for sabotage and kill him in the episode "Vendetta". Bullock is sent to prison, but Batman clears his name. In "A Bullet for Bullock", directly adapted from Detective Comics #651, Bullock teams up with Batman to find out who is behind several attempts on his life. At first, it appears to be a mob boss named Vinnie "The Shark" Starkey, but it is later revealed that it is actually his own landlord Nivens who is tired of Bullock's rudeness and sloppiness. Batman was able to stop Nivens who goes insane before Bullock. Bullock also makes a brief appearance in "Robin's Reckoning" in a flashback. After Dick Grayson's parents are killed by a trapeze that was sabotaged by Tony Zucco, Bullock is seen as a regular officer, examining the cut rope to the trapeze. Though Bullock is portrayed as more honest than in the comics, he himself admits to Batman that he too has often used dubious means to ensure that justice is served, and does his best to avoid investigations by Internal Affairs, but is visibly offended when Batman directly asks him if he is "on the take".
 Detective Bullock appears in The New Batman Adventures.
 Detective Bullock later makes guest appearances in Superman: The Animated Series, including "World's Finest" and "Knight Time".
 Detective Bullock appears in the Static Shock episode "Hard as Nails". At the beginning of the episode, he and his police officers find a bunch of netted criminals that were apprehended by Batman. Later on, he is with Commissioner Gordon when he tells Batman and Static that Poison Ivy and Harley Quinn have unleashed some seaweed that entrapped a ship containing gold bricks and blocked off the rest of the bay. After Batman and Static leave, Bullock asks Gordon, "What the heck did Robin do to his hair?" Gordon then shakes his head in disappointment.

Film
 In Sam Hamm's original script for Batman Returns, Bullock was originally supposed to appear as the companion of Commissioner Gordon. However, Bullock was removed from the script after Tim Burton agreed to return as director.
 Harvey Bullock appears in Batman: Mask of the Phantasm, a film spin-off from Batman: The Animated Series, voiced again by Costanzo. In the film, when Batman is framed for the murders of several mobsters, Bullock conducts his own manhunt for the Dark Knight with support from corrupt Councilman Arthur Reeves. Bullock very nearly succeeds in catching Batman in a police chase that culminates in a gunfight inside a construction site and an explosion. Despite being severely injured and unmasked, Batman manages to escape Bullock, who does not see Batman's face.
 Harvey Bullock also appears in Batman & Mr. Freeze: SubZero, reprised by Costanzo. His appearance here is very brief, only in the aftermath of Barbara Gordon's abduction by Mr. Freeze.
 Harvey Bullock also appears in Batman: Mystery of the Batwoman, voiced by Constanzo once again. He aids Batman and Gordon in the investigation of the mysterious Batwoman and her ties to the Penguin and Rupert Thorne. His new partner is Sonia Alcana, who is also one of the three Batwomen.
 Harvey Bullock appears in Batman: The Killing Joke, voiced by Robin Atkin Downes.
 Harvey Bullock appears in Scooby-Doo! & Batman: The Brave and the Bold, voiced by Fred Tatasciore.
 A Victorian era version of Harvey Bullock appears in Batman: Gotham by Gaslight, voiced by John DiMaggio.

Video games
 Harvey Bullock is not seen in the video game adaptation of Batman: The Animated Series, but his voice is heard when he warns Commissioner Gordon about the Penguin planting bombs.
 Bullock makes an appearance in the cutscenes of the Sega CD version of The Adventures of Batman & Robin; he arrests Poison Ivy when Batman defeats her.
 Harvey Bullock appears as a supporting character in Batman: Chaos in Gotham.
 Bullock and Montoya appeared in a cutscene in Batman: Dark Tomorrow for GameCube and Xbox, voiced by Danny Mastrogiorgio, while also being a playable character in the DS version of Lego Batman: The Video Game.
 Bullock also features as a non-playing character in the MMORPG DC Universe Online. In the hero campaign, the players encounter Harvey Bullock in a greenhouse that Poison Ivy is using as a hideout.
 Harvey Bullock appears as an ally of Captain Gordon in Batman: Arkham Origins, with Robert Costanzo reprising his voice role from Batman: The Animated Series. It is later revealed through extortion files collected by Edward Nashton (AKA Edward Nygma) that Bullock was ordered to become Gordon's partner by corrupt Police Commissioner Gillian B. Loeb. Bullock is first seen in the game during the Blackgate Penitentiary breakout where he, with Gordon, attempts unsuccessfully to bring down Batman. Bullock is also seen when Batman saves Joker's life. He later helps Gordon disarm Firefly's bombs. Bullock also takes part in the counter-attack on Joker's men when they attack Blackgate Penitentiary a second time.
 Harvey Bullock is referenced in Batman: Arkham Knight. In GCPD headquarters, the name "Bullock" can be seen in a board listing detectives shifts.
 Harvey Bullock appears in Telltale Games' Batman: The Enemy Within, voiced by Keith Szarabajka. First mentioned during the second episode, he makes his debut in "Fractured Mask", where he catches Bruce Wayne breaking into the late Riddler's lair. Though he tries to call the GCPD to inform them of Wayne's actions, he will either be knocked out by the billionaire or one of his associates, or bribed to keep quiet. Should the player create the villainous Joker, Bullock appears in the opening of "Same Stitch", where he is kidnapped by the criminal's men and used as part of a trap for Batman. However, the vigilante is able to save Bullock and, in return, is given a lead to investigate by the detective.
Harvey Bullock appears as an NPC in Lego DC Super-Villains.

Radio
 In Dirk Maggs' radio adaptation of Batman: Knightfall for BBC Radio 1, Bullock was portrayed and voiced by Eric Meyers.

See also
 Detective Arnold Flass

References

External links
Harvey Bullock at DC Comics' official website

Characters created by Archie Goodwin (comics)
Characters created by Howard Chaykin
Comics characters introduced in 1974
DC Comics television characters
Fictional American police detectives
Fictional alcohol abusers
Gotham City Police Department officers